The Riverina Movement was a short-lived movement that advocated an independent state for the Riverina region of New South Wales, Australia.

Background
Support for separation of the Riverina from the rest of New South Wales dates back to the 19th century. Following World War I, a Riverina New State League operated from 1921 to 1923. The Riverina Movement was one of a number of new state movements that emerged in Australia in the 1920s.

Formation and activities
The official launch of the Riverina Movement occurred at a riverside rally in Wagga Wagga on 28 February 1931.

An official badge was created for the movement, based on the Australian Army's Rising Sun badge with the addition of an Australian flag emblazoned with a capital "R" for Riverina. The badges, manufactured by Angus & Coote, were sold by the movement's women's auxiliary.

Aftermath
At the 1932 New South Wales state election, six members of the Riverina Movement were elected to state parliament - five Country Party MLA's, one United Australia Party MLA, and one Country Party MLC. Hardy was elected to the Senate at the 1931 federal election.

References

History of New South Wales
Riverina
1931 establishments in Australia